The Crusc de Rit is a mountain in the Dolomites in South Tyrol, Italy.

References
 Alpenverein South Tyrol

External links

Mountains of the Alps
Mountains of South Tyrol
Dolomites